Eckerd Corporation was an American drug store chain that was headquartered in Largo, Florida, and toward the end of its life, in Warwick, Rhode Island.

The chain had approximately 2,800 stores in 23 states as far west as Arizona. In November 1996, Eckerd drugs was purchased by JCPenney. In April 2004, the company, the fourth largest drug chain in the U.S., was broken up in a $4.52 billion deal, with approximately 1,269 stores in Florida, Louisiana and Texas, along with Eckerd's $1.3 billion mail order pharmacy, sold to CVS Corporation (now CVS Health). The deal enabled CVS to leapfrog past rival Walgreens with some 5,400 stores. Because CVS already owned 74 stores in Florida at the time, including 19 in the Tampa Bay Area, many duplicate locations were closed. The remaining stores were sold to the Quebec-based Jean Coutu Group and merged with its Brooks Pharmacy chain. The Eckerd name and corporate headquarters, which housed 1,000 administrative workers at the time in Largo, Florida, would remain temporarily intact while under the Coutu ownership. The sale erased the chain's name among its 622 Florida stores, where it had been synonymous with the pharmacy business since Jack Eckerd bought three old drugstores in the Tampa Bay area in 1952. Brooks Eckerd, Jean Coutu's U.S. operations, would eventually be sold to Rite Aid. In return, a stake in Rite Aid was ceded to the French-Canadian company. The remaining Eckerd locations became Rite Aids.

History 
Eckerd was founded in September 1898 (making it the oldest of the "big four" drugstore chains), by 27-year-old J. Milton Eckerd and Z. Tatom in Erie, Pennsylvania. In the company's early years, it operated at 1105 State Street in downtown Erie as the Erie Cut-Rate Medicine Store. In 1912, Eckerd and Tatom sold their original store to Eckerd's sons and moved to Wilmington, Delaware, establishing a new store. From Delaware, the chain expanded to North Carolina and later Florida. Jack Eckerd, son of the founder, was responsible for the expansion of the company when he acquired three stores in Florida in 1952.

In 1960, four African-American students from Allen University staged a sit-in at the Columbia, South Carolina store's Whites only lunch counter. In Bouie v. City of Columbia, the U.S. Supreme Court reversed their trespassing convictions.

In 1961, Eckerd changed from a proprietorship to a publicly owned company. At the height of Eckerd's success, it had over 2,800 stores in more than 20 states, including 1,600 stores with Eckerd Express Photo one-hour photo labs in 19 states, and revenue of $13.1 billion in fiscal year 2000. Between 1968 and 1985, Eckerd owned Eckerd's Apparel and J. Byrons department stores, as well as VideoConcepts, a chain of mall-based electronics shops. J. Byrons and VideoConcepts were sold off in 1985, the latter to Tandy Corporation.

JCPenney and Jean Coutu Group
JCPenney and Eckerd agreed to merge in 1996 and the merger took place in 1997. Penney paid $3.3-billion and assumed $760 million in debt to acquire Eckerd and combine it with its 800-store Thrift Drug chain. Under the agreement, all of JCPenney's Thrift Drug unit of drug stores (comprising Thrift Drug, Kerr Drugs, Fay's Drugs, and some Rite Aid stores) were rebranded to the Eckerd name. JCPenney Catalog Centers were added to Eckerd stores. JCPenney also bought more than 500 more stores from four other chains in New York state, Virginia and the Carolinas, such as the 1998 acquisition of the 141-store Genovese chain in the New York metropolitan area. These stores were renamed in 2003.

During this period Eckerd became the second largest drug store chain in the U.S., with over 2,800 stores stretching from New York and Connecticut to Florida and west to Arizona. One carryover from the Thrift Drug days after the merger took over was the presence of JCPenney Catalog Centers inside certain locations, which enabled Eckerd customers to order merchandise from store catalogs and pick it up at an Eckerd location. As technology, such as ordering over the Internet, began to gain traction, Eckerd fell behind by failing to update its IT networks.  Over the next seven years JCPenney came to see Eckerd as a distraction which would cost too much to continue fixing (as they were focused on their department stores), and in March 2004 it formally declared that it would carry Eckerd on its books as a discontinued asset. JCPenney took a $1.3-billion charge against earnings in connection with selling the drugstore chain, which had accounted for 45 percent of its annual revenues.

In July 2004, JCPenney sold the Eckerd stores to CVS Corp and Canada's Jean Coutu Group for $4.5 billion. CVS acquired 1,260 Eckerd stores and support facilities in Texas, Florida and other southern states, and their pharmacy benefits management and mail order businesses for $2.15 billion. Jean Coutu Group acquired about 1,540 stores and support facilities in the Northeast and mid-Atlantic (essentially everything from Georgia northward) for $2.375 billion.

CVS conversions

CVS bought more than 1,200 Eckerd stores and converted most of them to CVS Pharmacies in late 2004 and 2005, eliminating the Eckerd name from markets such as Florida, Texas, Oklahoma, Louisiana, and Mississippi, which had once been among the chain's strongholds. Even a few brand-new locations in Texas and Arizona were transformed into CVS almost as quickly as they were built as Eckerd stores. The CVS purchase also included the Eckerd stores located in Colorado; however, CVS opted to close these stores.
Customers are still able to pay for their purchases at CVS with their JCPenney credit card.

Brooks Eckerd Pharmacy

Jean Coutu purchased merged the Eckerd stores it acquired with its existing American pharmacy, Brooks. The merged company was based at Brooks' corporate headquarters in Warwick, Rhode Island. The Eckerd and Brooks chains shared many of the same corporate functions.  Jean Coutu operated the stores it purchased under the slightly modified "Eckerd Pharmacy" name and logo, featuring a red Eckerd capsule in an attempt to unify the Eckerd and Brooks chains.

Acquisition by Rite Aid

On August 23, 2006, The Wall Street Journal announced that Rite Aid would acquire 1,858 Eckerd Pharmacy and Brooks Pharmacy stores from Jean Coutu for US$3.4 billion. The deal closed on June 4, 2007. Rite Aid announced that the two chains would be converted to the Rite Aid name, retiring the 109-year-old Eckerd banner.  The merger was signed and completed as of June 4, 2007, with all remaining Eckerd stores converted to Rite Aid by the end of September 2007.

The conversion process consisted of two steps: new computer systems, and a full PPR (paint, powder, re-set) which consisted of new signage and a new design scheme. Many of the stores received new paint on their exteriors, making them look more like brick than the white stucco design of most Eckerd locations. Eckerd's remaining JCPenney Catalog Centers were closed in favor of Rite Aid choosing to accept JCPenney charge cards chainwide.

Slogans
You'll like what we'll do for you!
America's family drugstore
It's right at Eckerd!
That's the reason there's Eckerd: because America can't wait!
Right there with you (1998–2001)
Get more! (2001–2007)

See also

Thrift Drug

References

External links 
 Eckerd Pharmacy (Archive)
 Eckerd Corp History
 Deal has 2 firms splitting Eckerd

Defunct pharmacies of the United States
Retail companies established in 1898
Retail companies disestablished in 2007
Defunct companies based in Florida
Defunct companies based in Rhode Island
2007 mergers and acquisitions
Health care companies based in Florida
Health care companies based in Rhode Island
1898 establishments in Pennsylvania
2007 disestablishments in Rhode Island
Rite Aid
CVS Health
JCPenney